José Javier del Águila Martínez (born 7 March 1991, in Guatemala City) is a Guatemalan football midfielder. He currently plays for Deportivo Coatepeque in Liga Nacional, the Guatemalan Premier Division and for the Guatemala national team.

He represented Guatemala in the 2011 FIFA U-20 World Cup, the 2011 CONCACAF Gold Cup and in CONCACAF World Cup qualifying.

References

External links
Camerino Crema profile

1991 births
Living people
Sportspeople from Guatemala City
Guatemalan footballers
Association football midfielders
Guatemala international footballers
Comunicaciones F.C. players
2011 CONCACAF Gold Cup players